American rapper Big Sean has released five studio albums, four mixtapes, thirty-one singles (including thirty-seven as featured artist), eight promotional singles, and thirty-nine music videos. In 2008, Big Sean was discovered by American rapper and record producer Kanye West, who signed Sean to his record label GOOD Music—distributed through Def Jam Recordings. Since 2008, after signing a record deal to West's label G.O.O.D. Music, Sean's breakthrough career continued through his mixtapes such as Finally Famous Vol. 2: UKnowBigSean (2009) and Finally Famous Vol. 3: BIG (2010). While he was releasing these mixtapes, he collaborated on various tracks and/or singles from West, Royce da 5'9" and Chris Brown.

On June 28, 2011, Sean released his debut studio album, Finally Famous, debuting at number 3 on the US Billboard 200. The album's lead single, "My Last" peaked at number 30 on the US Billboard Hot 100 and topped the US Hot Rap Songs chart. The single was certified gold by the Recording Industry Association of America (RIAA). The album's second single, "Marvin & Chardonnay" peaked at number 32 on the Billboard Hot 100 and topped the US Hot R&B/Hip-Hop Songs chart. Additionally, it was certified platinum by the Recording Industry Association of America (RIAA). The album's third single, "Dance (A$$)" was released in a remixed form featuring rapper Nicki Minaj. The single peaked at number 10 on the Billboard Hot 100, and became certified triple platinum by the Recording Industry Association of America (RIAA).

In 2012, he collaborated with artists on several multiple Hot 100 top 40 singles, including "Mercy" by West, "My Homies Still" by Lil Wayne and "As Long as You Love Me" by Justin Bieber.

In 2014, Sean released "I Don't Fuck with You", which peaked at number 11 on the Billboard Hot 100 and topped the Hot R&B/Hip-Hop Songs chart; as well as being certified triple platinum by the Recording Industry Association of America (RIAA). On February 24, 2015, Big Sean released his best selling album, titled Dark Sky Paradise. The album received positive reviews and became his first studio album to top the Billboard 200. Since its release, six tracks from the album have charted on the Billboard Hot 100. The album's second single, 'Blessings', was certified triple platinum. Throughout the next year, another four tracks from Dark Sky Paradise—"Paradise", "One Man Can Change the World", "I Know" and "Play No Games"—were all certified platinum or higher by the Recording Industry Association of America (RIAA).

Albums

Studio albums

Collaborative albums

Mixtapes

EPs

Singles

As lead artist

As featured artist

Promotional singles

Other charted and certified songs

Guest appearances

Videography

As lead artist

As featured artist

Notes

References

External links
 Official website
 
 
 

Discographies of American artists
Hip hop discographies
Big Sean albums
Big Sean songs
Songs written by Big Sean